Le Couperon guardhouse is a historic building in the parish of Saint Martin, Jersey. It stands a few metres from Le Couperon dolmen.  The guardhouse was built in 1689 of local stone, with brick lintels. It supported a battery on the headland above as a magazine and shelter for the members of the Jersey militia that served the battery. The battery commanded Rozel Bay and by 1812 consisted of two 24-pounder muzzle-loading guns that fired over a low wall, which has long disappeared.

Buildings and structures in Saint Martin, Jersey
Coastal artillery
Fortifications in Jersey
History of Jersey
Jersey